A pet is an animal kept primarily for company, protection or entertainment.

Pet or PET may also refer to:

Science and technology

Science
 Polyethylene terephthalate, a common plastic material in the polyester family
 Paired-end tag, a short sequence at the end of a DNA fragment
 Photoinduced electron transfer, a process of electron transfer under action of light
 Pólya enumeration theorem, a mathematical theorem in enumerative combinatorics
 Potential evapotranspiration, a measure of the atmospheric demand for water vapour from evaporation and transpiration
 pET, a series of cloning expression vectors

Medicine
 Patulous Eustachian tube, a medical disorder affecting the middle ear 
 Positron emission tomography, a medical imaging technique
 Pre-eclampsia, a medical complication of pregnancy

Technology
 Commodore PET (Personal Electronic Transactor), a 1970s era personal computer
 Personal Energy Transportation, a mobility device for disabled individuals
 Privacy-enhancing technologies, a general term for a set of computer tools, applications and mechanisms

Organizations and businesses
 Politiets Efterretningstjeneste, the national intelligence security agency of Denmark
 PET International, non-profit organization that promotes and supports Personal Energy Transportation
 Pet, Inc., a former American producer of evaporated milk and other food products
 Pet Airways, an American company specializing in the transportation of pets

Arts and entertainment
 Personal Electronic Thing, part of the player-computer persona communications system in the Starship Titanic video game
 Personal Terminal (Mega Man), a handheld device used in the Mega Man Battle Network video games
 Pet (album), an album by Fur Patrol
 Pet (film), a 2016 American/Spanish psychological thriller
 Pet (manga), a manga series by Ranjō Miyake
 Pet (novel), a 2019 young adult speculative fiction novel by Nigerian author Akwaeke Emezi

Education
 Parent Effectiveness Training, a parent education program developed by Thomas Gordon
 Preliminary English Test, former name of the B1 Preliminary, an examination of English proficiency provided by Cambridge English
 Psychometric Entrance Test, an Israeli standardized university entrance exam

Transport
 Petts Wood railway station, London, England (National Rail station code)

Other uses
 Pierre Elliott Trudeau (1919–2000), nicknamed PET, former Prime Minister of Canada
 PET (time), the time zone for Peru
 Potentially Exempt Transfer, a concept in the inheritance tax code of the United Kingdom
 Presidential Electoral Tribunal, an electoral tribunal in the Philippines

See also
 Pets (disambiguation)